Malovše is a village on the northern edge of the Vipava Valley in the Municipality of Ajdovščina in the Littoral region of Slovenia.

Church

The local church is dedicated to Saints Cosmas and Damian and belongs to the Parish of Črniče.

References

External links 

Malovše at Geopedia

Populated places in the Municipality of Ajdovščina